The Sagara (or Sagala) are an ethnic and linguistic group based in Kilosa District of Morogoro Region, southern Dodoma Region, and parts of Iringa Region in Tanzania.  In 1987 the Sagara population was estimated to number 79,000 .

Ethnic groups in Tanzania
Indigenous peoples of East Africa